Red Bank is a commuter train station located in Red Bank, Monmouth County, New Jersey, United States. It is one of 20 NJ Transit commuter rail stations on the North Jersey Coast Line. It is located on Bridge Avenue between Monmouth and Oakland Streets, just south of the Navesink River, and consists of two high-level platforms on either side of grade crossings.

History 
Red Bank station was built by Central Railroad of New Jersey in 1875, has been on the National Register of Historic Places since 1976 and is part of the Operating Passenger Railroad Stations Thematic Resource. Notable visitors included Presidents Ulysses S. Grant, Theodore Roosevelt, Franklin D. Roosevelt, and King George VI of the United Kingdom. The 1876 station house was renovated in 2012–2014 to its appearance when built, including historically correct material, reconstruction of "Yankee" gutters, installation of new downspouts, and replacement of historic windows, shutters and gingerbread trim.  Repairs were made to roof soffits and wood framing of the structure, and to repoint the brick foundation wall and the brick chimney, and to recreate a brick "crown" atop the chimney. Exterior paint of the station matches its original color scheme.

Station layout
The station has two high-level side platforms that are eight cars long.

See also
List of New Jersey Transit stations
National Register of Historic Places listings in Monmouth County, New Jersey

References

External links

Red Bank Station Platform Improvement Project - UPDATE - Phase III Begins in February 2006 

NJ Transit Rail Operations stations
Red Bank, New Jersey
Stations on the North Jersey Coast Line
Former New York and Long Branch Railroad stations
Railway stations on the National Register of Historic Places in New Jersey
Railway stations in Monmouth County, New Jersey
National Register of Historic Places in Monmouth County, New Jersey
Railway stations in the United States opened in 1875
New Jersey Register of Historic Places
NJ Transit bus stations